Polkovnik Zhelyazovo is a village in Krumovgrad municipality, Kardzhali Province, located in the Eastern Rhodope Mountains of southern Bulgaria.

The village lies at 282 m above sea level.

References

Villages in Kardzhali Province